Ivar Lundberg (11 November 1878 – 31 July 1952) was a Swedish long-distance runner. He competed in the marathon at the 1912 Summer Olympics.

References

External links
 

1878 births
1952 deaths
Athletes (track and field) at the 1912 Summer Olympics
Swedish male long-distance runners
Swedish male marathon runners
Olympic athletes of Sweden
Athletes from Stockholm